Diesis is a small modification of music pitch.

Diesis may also refer to:
 Diesis (horse) (1980-2006)
 Diesis (typography) (‡), also known as a double dagger
 Sharp (music) (♯)